The Old Wyoming Trail  is a 1937 American Western film released by Columbia Pictures. Roy Rogers appears, albeit uncredited.

Cast

 Charles Starrett - Bob Patterson
 Donald Grayson - Sandy
 Barbara Weeks - Elsie Halliday
 Dick Curtis - Ed Slade
 Edward LeSaint - Jeff Halliday
 Guy Usher - Lafe Kenney
 George Chesebro - Hank Barstow
 Edward Peil Sr. - Sheriff (as Edward Peil)
 Edward Hearn - Hammond (as Eddie Hearn)

External links
 

1937 films
1937 Western (genre) films
American Western (genre) films
American black-and-white films
Columbia Pictures films
1930s English-language films
1930s American films